Alonia may refer to:

Alonia, Messenia, a village in the municipality Aris, Messenia, Greece
Alonia, Pieria, a village in the municipality Pydna, Pieria, Greece
Alonia, Zakynthos, a village in the municipality Alykes, Zakynthos, Greece
Marki Alonia, an archaeological site in Cyprus